Howard Nugent (1879-1952) was a US Republican politician from Michigan who served in the Michigan House of Representatives and was the longest-tenured Speaker in its history. Nugent was a candidate for Lieutenant Governor of Michigan in 1946, losing in the Republican primary to Eugene C. Keyes.

Nugent died on May 29, 1952, as a result of heart disease from which he was believed to be recovering.

References

1879 births
1952 deaths
Speakers of the Michigan House of Representatives
Republican Party members of the Michigan House of Representatives
Farmers from Michigan
People from Bad Axe, Michigan